Nasza Dyskobolia Grodzisk Wielkopolski is a Polish amateur football club based in Grodzisk Wielkopolski currently playing in the V liga (Greater Poland group).

Honours
 Klasa okręgowa (Greater Poland group): 
2nd place (1): 2020-21

 Klasa A (group Poznań III):
3rd place (1): 2018-19

 Klasa B (group Poznań IV):'
Winners (1): 2017-18

References

Football clubs in Poland
Association football clubs established in 2017